Fredlanea velutina is a species of beetle in the family Cerambycidae. It was described by Lane in 1966. It is found in Ecuador.

References

Hemilophini
Beetles described in 1966